Asklipieio is a former municipality in Argolis, Peloponnese, Greece. Since the 2011 local government reform it is part of the municipality Epidaurus, of which it is a municipal unit. The municipal unit has an area of 179.838 km2. Population 4,228 (2011). The seat of the municipality was in Lygourio.

The sanctuary of Asklepios at Epidaurus is situated on the territory of the municipal unit, hence its name.

References

Populated places in Argolis